Čestlice is a municipality and village in Prague-East District in the Central Bohemian Region of the Czech Republic. It has about 700 inhabitants. It is known for Aquapalace Prague, the largest water park in the country, and for an extensive commercial zone.

Geography

It lies in a flat agricultural landscape in the Prague Plateau.

History
The first written mention of Čestlice is from 1227. In 1457, the fortress in Čestlice was first mentioned. From 1541 to 1927, it was a property of Průhonice.

Economy
Aquapalace Prague, the biggest water park in the Czech Republic, is located in Čestlice. Čestlice is also known for its large commercial zone, which serves mainly for the inhabitants of Prague.

Transport
The D1 motorway leads across the municipality.

Sights
The Church of Saint Procopius was built in 1863–1864, on the place where a small church was documented already in the 14th century.

References

External links

Villages in Prague-East District